The Central Financial Work Commission (CFWC) is a commission of the Chinese Communist Party (CCP) in the process of establishment that will supervise the ideological and political role of the CCP in the Chinese financial system.

History 
CFWC was first created in 1998 to supervise the financial system on behalf of the CCP and to prevent deviations on the part of CCP-appointed managers. It was proposed by the staff of the Central Finance and Economics Leading Group (CFELG) and pursued by Zhu Rongji with the support of Jiang Zemin and Li Peng. The CFCW had political supervision and personnel authority over the People's Bank of China and state financial regulatory bodies, as well as over China's most important national firms.

The Central Financial Work Commission consisted of several core departments: the Organization Department, the Financial Discipline Inspection Work Commission and the Department of Supervisory Board Work. It had about 200 officials and was ranked above ministerial level. Its operations were supervised by Executive Deputy Secretary Yan Haiwang, and it regularly reported directly to its head, CFCW Secretary Wen Jiabao, who concurrently served as a member of the Politburo and as vice-premier in charge of work on finance. Wen was CFCW Secretary from 1998 until the organization's demise in 2002.  Some have interpreted this to be evidence of the fact that Wen was being groomed and tested for the position of premier, since he clearly lacked the experience to run effective financial policy.  The CFCW facilitated comprehensive personnel reshuffles during its existence, particularly in 1999 and 2000.

The CFWC was abolished at the 16th Party Congress in late 2002, and most of its functions were transferred to state regulatory bodies.  Sebastian Heilmann argues that the CFCW was created as part of a strategy to stop the breakdown of the hierarchies in the Chinese financial industry and to restore central policy decisiveness in the aftermath of the Asian financial crisis.  While this strategy was successful in establishing centralized supervision and homogenizing financial regulation, it failed to produce market-driven incentive structures for financial executives and clashed with nascent forms of corporate governance emerging in China. According to Heilmann, the dissolution of the CFCW constituted a major redefinition of Party control in economic regulation.

Xi Jinping era 
It was reestablished in 2023 under CCP general secretary Xi Jinping after wide-ranging reforms to change the Party and state structure, together with the Central Financial Commission. It was reported that it will supervise the ideological and political role of the CCP in the financial sector.

See also 
Economy of China

References 

Institutions of the Central Committee of the Chinese Communist Party
1998 establishments in China
2002 disestablishments in China
2023 establishments in China
Government finances in China